(25 February 1847 – 17 February 1917) was a Japanese painter.

Biography 
Shohin was born in Ōsaka Prefecture in 1847.

Shohin was appointed an Imperial household artist — an honour for the most distinguished artists — in 1904 and her pictures were bought by the Japanese Imperial family. She was a friend of the statesman Kido Takayoshi and she and Okuhara Seiko enjoyed his patronage. Kido and the two of them would create gassaku which are collaborative paintings that include both pictures and text.

Her daughters Iku and Shokei also became artists.

In 1982 Yamanashi Prefectural Museum of Art had an exhibition of her art.

Style 
Her surviving paintings seem to show a woman who felt equal to men in her culture. She illustrates women who appear as literati painting, playing music and doing calligraphy. Her paintings show some independence as women's paintings of her time usually followed tradition or the subjects laid down by the artist's schools.

References

1847 births
1917 deaths
People from Osaka
Japanese painters
Imperial household artists